Mała Ina is a river of Poland, a tributary of the Ina near Stargard.

Rivers of Poland
Rivers of West Pomeranian Voivodeship